"Two High" is a song recorded by American alt-rock band Moon Taxi, and is the lead single off the band's fifth studio album, Let the Record Play. The song was written by the band and was produced by guitarist Spencer Thomson. It was released on May 5, 2017.

Background
Lead vocalist Trevor Terndrup cited the peace sign as inspiration for the song, and said that the song was about hope and acceptance. The song came about when band member Wes Bailey's phone autocorrected the phrase "too high" to "two high", evoking images of the peace sign. A music video for the song was released on November 9, 2017.

In 2021, the band re-recorded the track as a duet with Hawaiian ukulele player Jake Shimabukuro for his album Jake & Friends.

Performance
"Two High" garnered over 64 million streams on Spotify.

Charts

Weekly charts

Year-end charts

Certifications

References

2017 songs
2017 singles
RCA Records singles